Smak is a Russian culinary entertainment television program that airs on Channel One Russia. It debuted on 20 November 1993.

The first guest on the program was the actor Aleksandr Abdulov. In 1996, the guest on Smak was Chuck Norris, and in 2015 the show was attended by Til Schweiger. The kitchen studio has been visited many times by TV presenter Valdis Pelšs.

Hosts 
 1993–2005: Andrei Makarevich
 2006–2018: Ivan Urgant

References

External links
 Official website
 Official YouTube-channel

1990s Russian television series
2000s Russian television series
2010s Russian television series
1993 Russian television series debuts
Channel One Russia original programming
Russian cooking television series